Jargon aphasia is a type of fluent aphasia in which an individual's speech is incomprehensible, but appears to make sense to the individual.
Persons experiencing this condition will either replace a desired word with another that sounds or looks like the original one, or has some other connection to it, or they will replace it with random sounds.
Accordingly, persons with jargon aphasia often use neologisms, and may perseverate if they try to replace the words they can not find with sounds.

Causes 
People affected by jargon aphasia usually are elderly and/or people who have damage to the neural pathways of certain parts of the brain.
This is usually the result of the following conditions:
 Stroke
 Traumatic brain injury
 Epilepsy
 Migraine
 Brain tumor
 Alzheimer's disease
 Parkinson's disease

Since jargon is associated with fluent (Wernicke's) aphasia, it is usually caused by damage to the temporal lobe, and more specifically, Wernicke's area.
After the condition is diagnosed, a CT or MRI scan is typically used to determine the location and severity of the brain damage that has caused the aphasia.

There have been cases in which aphasia has developed after damage to only the right hemisphere of the brain.
These cases are few and far between, and usually involve unique circumstances for the individual.
Most commonly, these results can stem from brain organization that is different than the general population, or a heavier than normal reliance on the right hemisphere of the brain.

Diagnosis 
Someone with jargon aphasia may exhibit the following behaviors:
 intermixing real words and nonsensical words while speaking or writing
 failing to recognize mistakes being made while speaking or writing
 using real words in incorrect situations
 frequent, repetitive uttering of low-frequency words
 the inability to say or write a specific word or phrase

Some of the specific types of language errors that occur are:
 lexical (real word)
 semantic
 Real word that was semantically related to target. ("dog" instead of "cat")
 formal
 Real word that shared either the initial phoneme or at least 50% of phonemes with target. ("dog" instead of "desk" or "dog" instead of "frog")
 mixed
 Real word that was both semantically and phonologically related to target. ("bicycle" instead of "motorcycle")
 visual
 Real word of an item similar in visual form to the target. ("ball" instead of "orange")
 unrelated
 Real word that was not related to the target in any obvious way. ("dog" instead of "apple")
 non-lexical (nonword)
 phonological
 Nonword that shared either the initial phoneme or at least 50% of phonemes with target. ("deg" instead of "dog")
 neologistic
 Nonword not reaching the criterion for phonological relatedness (i.e., sharing less than 50% of phonemes with the target and with a different initial phoneme). Nonwords that are pseudo-compound words. ("kib" instead of "dog")
 other errors
 Don't know
 Indication that response was unknown or item was not responded to at all. ("I don’t know" or silence)
 description
 Attempts to describe as opposed to name item. (Multiple word responses)

Jargon aphasia must be diagnosed through a series of tests. Since the number of individuals that have aphasia after suffering a stroke is high, a test is usually carried out soon after the stroke occurs. There is a list of basic exercises to help assess a person's language skills, such as:
 naming objects that begin with a certain letter
 reading or writing
 holding a conversation
 understanding directions and commands

There is also a common test used, called the Boston Diagnostic Aphasia Examination test, which incorporates exercises that extensively review the person's language skills.

Treatments 
The only way to treat aphasia is with a speech-language pathologist (SLP). It will not completely restore the person's prior level of communication, but SLP can lead to a massive improvement of jargon aphasia. Recipients of this treatment typically achieve better use of residual language abilities, improved language skills, and the ability to communicate in a different way by making up for missing words in their speech.

One specific method that has shown to lead to improvements with certain symptoms is phonological component analysis, or PCA for short. Participants in PCA therapy tend to improve in the ability to name specific items that they are test on, as well as the decrease in use of nonwords to describe said items. Seeing promising results from this type of therapy has led to much optimism in hopes of developing more treatment methods for jargon aphasia.

History 
Hughlings Jackson is believed to have been the person who initially contributed the term "jargon" to aphasiology. He used this term not to distinguish a separate type of aphasia, but to describe the language output of certain people that was meaningless and incomprehensible to the listener, although it appeared to have some meaning for the speaker.

Other meanings and types 
There are many different meanings when people refer to jargon aphasia. Since Hughling Jackson's time, it has covered a broad range of similar verbal behaviors and has been used to describe a multitude of different aphiastic disturbances. Some of the behaviors are described as the person having speaking in a "confused, unintelligible language", "a strange, outlandish, or barbarous dialect", "a hybrid language", and can be referred to as a pretentious language marked by circumlocutions and long words. Observation of these behaviors has led to a branching of different types of jargon.
 Neologistic jargon is the production of language containing non-existent words that are not related to what the person is attempting to convey.
 Phonemic jargon is the production of language containing inappropriate words that are phonemically related to what the person is attempting to convey.
 Semantic jargon is the production of language which is devoid of content and consists of real words that are inappropriate given the context of the situation.

All of these types of jargon are seen in fluent aphasia, which can more commonly be addressed as Wernicke's aphasia.

Contradictions and different viewpoints 
 Weinstein
 Weinstein's viewpoint of jargon illustrates just the basic rambling and incoherent but structurally intact speech. It does not include details about neologisms and paraphasias. He and his coworkers view jargon as a positive symptom of aphasia, and as an adaptive behavior and form of denial, or anosognosia, in the presence of language deficit.
 Schuell
 Shuell views jargon as the result of severe impairment in the recall of learned auditory patterns and imperfect auditory feedback processes. The lack of control of verbal output is related to reduced auditory input.
 Cohn and Neumann
 Their viewpoint is that jargon results from the disruption of the sequential ordering of speech.
 Alajouanine
 Alajouanine's viewpoint highlights that the reason for jargon cannot be found in the breakdown of the intrinsic speech structure itself. He stressed that incomprehensibility and lack of meaning, rather than articulatory abnormality or lack of proper grammatical sequencing were the essence of jargon. He often spoke of a "suppression of the semantic values of language" in jargon.

References

Further reading 
 
 
 
 
 

Neurological disorders
Aphasias